Tomás N. Alonso (1881 – 1962) is a well-known Cebuano Visayan writer. He published the first complete Cebuano translation of Jose Rizal's El filibusterismo. He also translated the Mi último adiós. He was a columnist with Bag-ong Suga and editor of the Spanish publication La opinión.

References
 www.bisaya.com Visayan Literature page

1881 births
1962 deaths
Visayan writers
Cebuano writers
Filipino writers
Cebuano people